The 1986 Motorcraft Formula Ford Driver to Europe Series was an Australian motor racing competition open to Formula Ford racing cars. It was the 17th Australian Formula Ford Series and the second to carry the Motorcraft Formula Ford Driver to Europe Series name.

The series was won by Warwick Rooklyn driving an Elwyn 003/004.

Calendar

The series was contested over eight rounds with one race per round.

Points system
Points were awarded on a 20-15-12-10-8-6-4-3-2-1 basis for the first ten places at each round.

Series standings

 The 1600cc four cylinder Ford Kent engine was mandatory for all cars.
 The above table lists the first twelve placegetters only.

References

Motorcraft Formula Ford Driver to Europe Series
Australian Formula Ford Series